Bernhardi may refer to:

People 
 Friedrich von Bernhardi (1849–1930), Prussian general
 Johann Jakob Bernhardi (1774–1850), German doctor and botanist
 August Ferdinand Bernhardi (1769–1820), German linguist and writer
 Bartholomäus Bernhardi of Feldkirchen (1487-1551), German scholar and Lutheran priest

Animals and plants 
 Prince Bernhard's titi (Callicebus bernhardi), a species of New World monkey
 Bernardia, a plant genus

See also 
 Bernhard (disambiguation)